The Revolution of 1830 can be:

 The July Revolution in France leading to a constitutional monarchy lasting until the revolutions of 1848
 The Belgian Revolution in the United Kingdom of the Netherlands leading to the creation of Belgium
The November Uprising in Poland, a failed attempt to overthrow Russian rule